The Mackerras federal election pendulum, 2006 (by Malcolm Mackerras) shows the state of the major political parties ahead of the 2007 Australian federal election. The table shows seats in the Australian House of Representatives arranged in the form of a Mackerras pendulum based on their 2004 federal election two-party preferred result. Some seats in New South Wales and Queensland underwent a redistribution in 2006, their margins have been recalculated due to this.

MPs shown in italics are not contesting the 2007 election. Gwydir, held by John Anderson for the Nationals, was abolished in the last redistribution and is not shown. Notionally government-held seats are shown on the left, with other seats shown on the right.

Very safe seats

Safe seats

Fairly safe seats

Marginal seats

Notes

References
 Mackerras Pendulum, 2007
 Mackerras' academic staff web site

Pendulums for Australian federal elections
2007 elections in Australia 
Political history of Australia